This is an article showing the matches of 1. FFC Turbine Potsdam's appearances in UEFA international competitions.

Overall record

2004–05 UEFA Women's Cup
Turbine Potsdam were European champions in their international debut, overcoming the main group stage and defeating Energiya Voronezh, Trondheims-Ørn SK and Djurgården/Älvsjö with 8 wins and one draw. Conny Pohlers was the competition's top scorer with 14 goals.

Second stage

Quarter-finals

Semifinals

Final

2005–06 UEFA Women's Cup
Like the previous year, Turbine reached the final, notably overcoming a first-leg home defeat in the semifinals against Djurgården/Älvsjö, but lost it against 1. FFC Frankfurt. Conny Pohlers was again the competition's top scorer. The 12-1 victory over SV Neulengbach remains Turbine's largest win in UEFA competitions.

Second stage

Quarter-finals

Semifinals

Final

2006-07 UEFA Women's Cup

Second stage

Quarter-finals

2009-10 UEFA Women's Champions League

Round of 32

Round of 16

Quarter-finals

Semifinals

Final

2010-11 UEFA Women's Champions League

Round of 32

Round of 16

Quarter-finals

Semifinals

Final

2011-12 UEFA Women's Champions League

Round of 32

Round of 16

Quarter-finals

Semifinals

2012-13 UEFA Women's Champions League

Round of 32

Round of 16

2013-14 UEFA Women's Champions League

Round of 32

Round of 16

Quarter-finals

Semifinals

References

Turbine Potsdam
European football